Kovačevo (Cyrillic: Ковачево) may refer to:

Kovačevo (Novi Pazar), a village in Serbia
Kovačevo Selo, a village in Bosnia and Herzegovina

See also
Kovachevo (disambiguation) (Ковачево)
Kovač (disambiguation)
Kovači (disambiguation)
Kovačić (disambiguation)
Kovačići (disambiguation)
Kovačica (disambiguation)
Kovačice, a village
Kovačina, a village
Kovačevac (disambiguation)
Kovačevci (disambiguation)
Kovačevići (disambiguation)
Kováčová (disambiguation)
Kováčovce, a village